Arnab or Arnav  is a first name popular in India, and means "ocean" in Sanskrit. It also means "rabbit" in Arabic. Notable people with the name include:

 Arnab Basu, game designer, video-games producer; known for Tomb Raider series
 Arnab Chakrabarty (born 1980), classical musician and sarod player
 Arnab Chanda (born 1981), English born actor, writer, and director
 Arnab Das Sharma (born 1987), Indian footballer
 Arnab Goswami (born 1973), Indian journalist
 Arnab Mondal (born 1989), Indian footballer
 Arnab Nandi (born 1987), Indian first-class cricketer
 Arnab Rai Choudhuri (born 1956), Indian scientist

Films 

 Arnab, a film on Arnab Goswami

See also
 El Arnab, traditional Arab solitaire

Indian masculine given names
Hindu given names